The flags of the Soviet Socialist Republics were all defaced versions of the flag of the Soviet Union, which featured a golden hammer and sickle and a gold-bordered red star (the only exception being the Georgian SSR, which used a red hammer and sickle and a fully red star) on a red field.

History 
When Byelorussia and Ukraine were the founding members of the United Nations in 1945, all of their flags were red with only small markings in upper left corners and needed distinct flags for each other.

In February 1947, the Presidium of the Supreme Soviet of the USSR issued a resolution calling for the Soviet republics to adopt new flags, which each of its republics were recommended to develop and adopt new national flags. So they expressed the idea of a union state, asked to use the symbols of the State flag of the Soviet Union, such as the gold hammer and sickle and the red star, as well as maintain the predominance of red color on the flag of the Union republics. National, historical and cultural features of each republic was instructed to express the other colors and the order of their location, as well as the location based on the national emblem or coat of arms. After competitions for the best projects from 1949–1954 the new flags of the 16 republics were developed and adopted. The authorities in Ukraine and Byelorussia were the first to adopt the flags on 5 July 1950, and 25 December 1951, respectively. All others followed suit between 1952 and 1953 with the last republic, the Russian SFSR, adopted the flag on 9 January 1954. 

Following the dissolution of the Soviet Union on 26 December 1991, only Kazakhstan, Kyrgyzstan, Tajikistan (without hammer and sickle), Turkmenistan and Ukraine retained their Soviet republic flags as independent states until the new official flags were adopted in 1992. Since 1995 (current version adopted in 2012) Belarus retains its old Soviet flag with only minor changes.

Their final versions prior to re-adoption of the non-Soviet national flags were as follows:

Flags of other republics
Other Union Republics and autonomous republics existed within the Soviet Union, mostly using flags on a similar pattern, or the flag of their "parent" Union Republic, further defaced. Today, the only former Soviet Union territories that use modified versions of their original Soviet flag are the republic of Transnistria (a state of limited recognition, formerly part of the Moldavian SSR) and Belarus (since 1995).

The official flags of the ASSRs were seldom used, and were generally the flag of the republic to which the ASSR belonged, defaced with the ASSR name in its own language(s) and the official language of the SSR; flags matching this pattern are not displayed in the gallery below:

See also
Communist symbolism
Emblems of the Soviet Republics
Flag of the Soviet Union
Flags of the federal subjects of Russia

Notes

References

External links

FotW chart of all the flags of the SSRs through history

Soviet Republics
 
Flags